International Relations is a quarterly peer-reviewed academic journal that covers the field of international relations. The journal's editors-in-chief are Ken Booth (Aberystwyth University), Milja Kurki (Aberystwyth University) and William Bain (National University of Singapore). It was established in 1960 and is currently published by SAGE Publications in association with the David Davies Memorial Institute.

Abstracting and indexing 
International Relations is abstracted and indexed in:
 Academic Abstracts
 Academic Index
 Current Contents/Social and Behavioral Sciences
 Economic Literature Index
 Social Sciences Citation Index
 Worldwide Political Science Abstracts

According to the Journal Citation Reports, the journal has a 2014 impact factor of 1.191, ranking it 23rd out of 85 journals in the category "International Relations".

References

External links 
 

SAGE Publishing academic journals
English-language journals
International relations journals
Quarterly journals
Publications established in 1960